Tiffany Vise (born February 2, 1986) is an American retired pair skater. Between 2003 and 2009, she competed with partner Derek Trent. On November 17, 2007, Vise and Trent landed the first clean throw quadruple salchow jump in international competition. They officially became the first team to perform that element in international competition.

Their partnership ended in the spring of 2009 when Trent retired from competitive skating. Vise teamed up with Don Baldwin and began competing with him in the 2009–2010 season.

Vise is a clockwise spinner while her partners have been counter-clockwise spinners. They were therefore mirror pair teams.

Personal life
Vise was born in Aurora, Colorado. Her younger sister, Brittany Vise, also competed in pair skating.

Tiffany Vise married Don Baldwin on August 23, 2015, in San Diego, California.

Career

Early years 
Vise began skating at age four. She is right-handed, but spins "lefty" (clockwise). She competed with Ryan Bradley from 1997–1998. Following that partnership, she teamed up with Laureano Ibarra. She competed with Ibarra at the World Junior Championships, placing 6th, and on the ISU Junior Grand Prix series.

Partnership with Trent 
Vise teamed up with Derek Trent in July 2003. They had skated for years at the same rink and his partnership had ended at the same time. Because they were both partnerless, they tried out together, despite the fact that they rotate in opposite directions. Very few teams at the highest level rotate in opposite directions because it makes elements like pair spins and twists much more difficult, due to the fact that one partner will have to "force" him- or herself to rotate in the "wrong" direction in order to complete the element (Vise spun his way on twist lifts). They represented the Broadmoor Skating Club.

Vise/Trent won the bronze medal at their first major event together, the 2003 Golden Spin of Zagreb. Beginning in the 2006–2007 season, Vise/Trent began attempting a throw quadruple salchow jump in competition. At the 2006 Skate Canada International, they were credited with fully rotating the element but not with landing it successfully.

Vise/Trent began the 2007–2008 season at the 2007 Skate Canada, where they placed 5th. During the free skate at the 2007 Trophée Eric Bompard, they became the first-ever pair to successfully execute a throw quad salchow in an international competition. They won the pewter medal at the 2008 U.S. Championships and were sent to the 2008 Four Continents, where they placed 8th.

In the 2008–2009 season, Vise/Trent placed 5th at the 2008 Skate Canada International and the 2008 Trophée Eric Bompard. They placed 8th at the 2009 U.S. Championships. The pair was coached by Doug Ladret and Jill Watson in Scottsdale, Arizona.

On April 30, 2009, Trent announced his retirement from competitive figure skating.

Partnership with Baldwin 
Vise teamed up with Don Baldwin in March 2009. They won the senior pairs' event at the Pacific Coast Sectional Championships. Internationally, the pair won silver at the 2010 Ice Challenge in Graz, Austria, and bronze at the 2012 U.S. International Figure Skating Classic. They received three Grand Prix assignments and finished 6th at all three events. They were coached by Lara Ladret and Doug Ladret in Scottsdale, Arizona.

Vise/Baldwin announced their retirement from competition in April 2013 and said that they would coach together at the Ice Den in Scottsdale, Arizona.

Programs

With Baldwin

With Trent

With Ibarra

Competitive highlights 
GP: Grand Prix; JGP: Junior Grand Prix

With Baldwin

With Trent

With Ibarra

With Bradley

Ladies' singles

References

External links 

 
 Vise and Trent official site

Living people
1986 births
American female pair skaters
Sportspeople from Aurora, Colorado
Figure skaters from Colorado Springs, Colorado
21st-century American women
20th-century American women